Shimpling is a village and former civil parish  south of Norwich, now in the parish of Burston and Shimpling, in the South Norfolk district, in the county of Norfolk, England. In 1931 the parish had a population of 134.

Amenities 
Shimpling has a church called St George. It is one of 124 round tower churches in Norfolk and now redundant. It is in the care of the Churches Conservation Trust.

Location 
Historically, Shimpling was bounded on the east by Dickleburgh, on the west by Burston, on the south by Thelton, and on the north by Gissing. These divisions largely remain.

History 
The name "Shimpling" is Old English and means 'Scimpel's people'. Shimpling was recorded in the Domesday Book as Simplinga(ham). On 1 April 1935 the parish was abolished and merged with Burston.

References

External links 

 
St George's on the European Round Tower Churches website

Villages in Norfolk
Former civil parishes in Norfolk
South Norfolk